The following is a list of characters from the series Mega Man: Fully Charged.

Main
 Mega Man (voiced by Vincent Tong) is the protagonist and hero of Silicon City. Aki Light is a robot boy who looks like a regular human, and with the ability to transform into his superhero identity of Mega Man. He can fire energy blasts from his arm cannon and has the ability to replicate the schematics of other robots in order to copy their abilities while having the personalities of some of them as a side-effect. Due to a failsafe, Aki can only hold up to three schematics at a time, which are stored onto SD card like chips. In "Too Mush is Never Enough", it's shown that Mega Mini can disable this failsafe, but MegaMan would dangerously lose control. While he can act cocky at times, he cares deeply for his family and friends and will risk his life to protect them to the best of his ability. He is considered highly advanced due to his power set.
 Mega Mini (voiced by Ryan Beil) is Aki's mechanic and sidekick of sorts who powers his armor and gives him his abilities. He occasionally pops out of his head to speak and loves to make wisecracks. What started off as animosity for Blasto Woman after getting kidnapped by her, has turned into a full on crush that seems to be reciprocated.
 Suna Light (voiced by Caitlyn Bairstow) is Aki's human sister and ally. She is the one of the few who knows about Aki's double identity. She is intelligent and has numerous gadgets at her disposal to aid her "ro-bro". In the Boom comic series, Suna dons a red battle armor becoming Zero.
 Dr. Thomas Light (voiced by Garry Chalk) is Aki's father and a supporter of human/robot relations. In "Panic in the Lighthouse," it is revealed that he has always known of his son's double identity which he makes Aki know of after using the Mega Key to heal Chaotique.
 Rush is the Light family's robot dog. He eventually gets his own armor and becomes Mega Man's sidekick.

Supporting
 Bert Wily (voiced by Cole Howard) is Aki's friend and ally. He is an enthusiastic up and coming inventor who is a huge fan of Mega Man, but does not realize that he and Aki are on and the same. The episodes "Drilling Deep" and "A Split End" hints at his connection to Dr. Wily when Bert accidentally gets a similar hairstyle. The Boom comic mini-series reveals that Dr. Wily is Bert's grandfather, whom he looks up to. 
 Peter Punkowski (voiced by Cole Howard) is a nerdy know-it-all at Silicon Central School.
 Ashley Adderley (voiced by Shannon Chan-Kent) is an intellectual and sarcastic girl who Aki secretly has a crush on. She in turn has a crush on Mega Man.
 Jacques is a small toaster-themed robot at Silicon Central.
 Principal 100100 (voiced by Brian Drummond) is a former battle robot the size of a building who is refashioned as the principal of Silicon Central School. During the Hard Age, Principal 100100 was a close ally and fellow soldier of Wood Man.
 Good Guild are a police squadron who is charged with protecting Silicon City. Unfortunately, they aren't trained to handle the rogue Robot Masters and have to turn to Mega Man to help defeat them.

Villains
 Sgt. Night/Lord Obsidian (voiced by Michael Adamthwaite) is the main antagonist of the series. Sgt. Breaker Night is a human who wants to destroy human/robot relations by persuading some robots into attacking humans. When out in public, he gives anti-robot rallies where he believes that humans and robots can't be together. In the past, Sgt. Night took part in a long-forgotten conflict called the Hard Wars where humans and robots fought each other. When he becomes Lord Obsidian, he is a powerful robot hellbent on wanting to turn Mega Man the perfect weapon for his own goals. In the season 1 finale after his defeat and his exposure as Lord Obsidian, Sgt. Night reveals that he wants to use the "Mega Key" to turn all robots into slaves. Sgt. Night is then arrested by the Good Guild along with most of his Robot Masters. Before being taken away, Dr Light also informed Sgt. Night that someday robots & humans shall know peace, a fact the latter will have plenty of time to consider in prison. 
 Namagem (voiced by Vincent Tong) is Sgt. Night's robot lieutenant who was created to be better than Mega Man. He wants to prove himself superior to his heroic counterpart by any means necessary. Unlike Mega Man, Namagem can copy up to five schematics at a time. A running gag throughout the first season had Aki failing to learn his name. When he finally does, he admits that it sounded lame. In "The Gauntlet" Pt. II, it is revealed that he is Aki's long lost twin brother who was stolen by Sgt. Night when the Hard Age was ending. His true form is revealed when Sgt. Night is defeated. Having been broken by Sgt. Night, Namagem takes his leave vowing revenge. In the Boom comic series, he takes on the name "Daini" and receives upgrades from Dr. Wily. He fights Aki one more time before they and Suna team-up against Dr. Wily. 
 The Hoover Gang are a trio of criminals that consist of two humans and one robot. They used to work as custodians before turning to a life of crime.
 Wayne (voiced by Ryan Beil) is the member of the Hoover Gang.
 Duane (voiced by Michael Adamthwaite) is the member of the Hoover Gang.
 Vacuhead is an unnamed robot who is a member of the Hoover Gang. He has a tank on his back and a window scrubber for a left hand.
 Chaotique (voiced by Rhona Rees) is a prankster robot with skates that allow her to move at super-speed. She likes being called "Cay Cay" and claimed to know Mega Man's true identity in the episode Old School, but it turns out that she had mistakenly believed Peter Punkowski to be Mega Man's secret identity, she was proven wrong in the episode "Old School" at the time when she tried to recreate "The Big Fade Away" prank.

Robot Masters

The following Robot Masters in this series are listed in order of appearance:

 Fire Man (voiced by Ian Hanlin) is a former welding bot who turns against humanity after he is fired. He has become loyal to Lord Obsidian.
 Drill Man (voiced by Andrew McNee) is a construction robot frustrated with being forced into the family business upon it being bought by Skyraisers Inc. when he wanted to be a musician.
 Hypno Woman (voiced by Kathleen Barr) is a former school counselor robot at Silicon Central with hypnotic mind control powers who left her job after being overwhelmed with solving the students' problems. She has a human disguise named Mari and wishes to become more domesticated.
 Wave Man (voiced by Samuel Vincent) is a former sewer sanitation robot who floods the city for his missing alligator friend.
 Ice Man (voiced by Travis Turner) is a misinformed robot with ice-based abilities who wants to be a hero just like Mega Man. Due to a bug in his system, he takes everything too literally. Unlike other incarnations of the character, Ice Man wears a normal jacket along with a small winter hat instead of a parka, leaving his snow-white hair visible.
 Blasto Woman (voiced by Kathleen Barr) is a jet aircraft-themed robot and former cargo delivery robot who is after money and will take up any contract. She later takes a liking to Mega Mini. In "The Gauntlet" Pt. 2, Blasto Woman is persuaded by Mega Mini to turn against Lord Obsidian.
 Air Man (voiced by Ian Hanlin) is a vain fan-powered robot who considers himself to be the best at everything. In this show, Air Man more resembles Wind Man since he has fans on poles connected to his back instead of a fan-shaped torso. The fans on his shoulders help him fly in the air and the fan for his right hand can cause tornadoes. In "The Bluster Bunch," it is revealed that his arrogance hides his insecurity from his siblings constantly boasting about their successful accomplishments and belittling him.
 Chemistry Man (voiced by Peter New) – Mr. NRT is a former chemistry teacher at Silicon Central who was fired by Principal 100100 for his boring lectures putting his students to sleep. Sgt. Breaker Night persuades him to go rogue and gave him the name of Chemistry Man. He can emit bubbles that can affect the respectful systems of both humans and robots as well as being adept at making chemical compounds. Mr. NRT's name is a pun on "inert."
Guts Man (voiced by Peter New in a Russian accent) is a garbage-disposal robot with super strength. He can create shock waves by slamming his hands on his robotic stomach and can also grow larger and more powerful upon eating garbage. In later episodes, it is revealed he can eat both organic and inorganic matter, not just garbage to get a power up.
 Elec Man (voiced by Andrew McNee) is a hyperactive electrical robot who can move at super speed and absorb and blast electricity from his giant plug for a left hand. Similar to the version seen in MegaMan: NT Warrior, Elec Man has surge arresters on his back.
 Wood Man (voiced by Mark Oliver) is a former soldier in the Hard Age who eventually comes to grips with the fact the war is over. He was also a close ally and fellow soldier of Principal 100100 during the Hard Age. After being persuaded to stop attacking by Mega Man, Wood Man leaves for the forest where he becomes a historian for the tourists that visit his forest.
 Junk Man is a remote-controlled robot created by Aki and Suna to act as a practice robot for Rush to fight. Junk Man was later upgraded by Dr. Light to help guard his laboratory.
 Cut Man (voiced by Colin Murdock) – Chauncey is a gardener and robot perfectionist with a bowl cut-shaped head who can get easily agitated if his work is messed up due to his faulty programming. He can fire small blades from his hands that can cut anything. While he has tried to change, he still has a short temper. His real name is a reference to the protagonist from the movie Being There.

Other
 Man Man (voiced by Ian Hanlin) is an average man with a poorly constructed outfit who wants to be a hero like Mega Man. His costume is based on the "Bad Box Art Mega Man" from the infamous North American cover of the original game.
 Bluster Bunch are a trio of air-themed robots that are the siblings of Air Man where they are similar in design, ability, and personality except for some cosmetic differences.
 Mary Flair (voiced by Michael Adamthwaite) is Air Man's sister who works as an "award-winning special effects artist/director/writer extraordinaire" for weather disaster films. Her fans are a different shape than Air Man's fans.
 Volt Aire (voiced by Ian Hanlin) is Air Man's brother who is an inventor and engineer. Volt Aire does not have fans like Air Man. His name is a pun on the French philosopher Voltaire.
 Captain Dare (voiced by Ian Hanlin) is Air Man's brother who is a stunt pilot and has a single rocket thruster instead of fans.
 Mrs. CHO (voiced by Lauren Jackson) is a heavyset chemical-themed robot who is the replacement chemistry teacher at Silicon Central School. She is beloved by everyone.
 Hal (voiced by Brian Drummond) is an elderly robot who invented the Excitron 2000. In his youth, he pulled off the biggest prank at Silicon Central School called "The Big Fade Away."
 Drill Man Sr. (voiced by Andrew McNee) is the father of Drill Man who dragged him into the family business.
 Jenny & Max (voiced by Mavis Green and Cole Howard) are two identical twins in Silicon City, they are friendly to Catherine and others.

References

Mega Man: Fully Charged
Mega Man: Fully Charged
Fully Charged